SS Tyndareus was a British steamship that was built in 1914–15 as a cargo liner for the Blue Funnel Line of the Ocean Steamship Company. Completed during the First World War, she served as a troop ship and was nearly sunk by a German naval mine, but without loss of life. Between the wars she operated commercially in the Pacific Ocean, before returning to military service in the Second World War. Her final civil role was to carry Islamic pilgrims from Indonesia to Mecca, before being scrapped in 1960.

Description
She was powered by two triple expansion steam engines, which had cylinders of 22in (56 cm),  and  diameter by  stroke. The engines drove twin screw propellers.

Construction
The ship was ordered on 3 March 1914, intended for the Ocean Steamship Company's Trans-Pacific Service, and was built at the yard of Scotts Shipbuilding and Engineering Company Ltd at Greenock on the River Clyde in Scotland. On completion in November 1916, she was taken-up as a troopship by the Admiralty under the Liner Requisition Scheme. The United Kingdom Official Number 137527 and Code Letters JPNG were allocated. Her port of registry was Liverpool.

First World War
Her maiden voyage in January 1917 was from her home port of Liverpool to the Far East, under Captain George Flynn. On 6 February 1917, Tyndareus struck a mine which had been laid by the merchant raider, SMS Wolf, while about 10 miles (16 km) off Cape Agulhas, the geographic southern tip of the African continent. The explosion tore a large hole in the forward part of her hull and she began to sink by the head. On board were 30 officers and 1,000 men of the 25th (Garrison Service) Battalion, The Middlesex Regiment, who were bound for Hong Kong, commanded by Lieutenant-Colonel John Ward, who was the Liberal–Labour Member of Parliament for Stoke-upon-Trent. The troops were paraded on deck in their life jackets while a roll call was taken. According to an account published in the Cape Times, the soldiers then began to sing "There's a Long Long Trail A-Winding" and "It's a Long Way to Tipperary" while waiting for further orders, which the journalist described as a "fine story of British pluck, recalling that of the Birkenhead". Despite rough seas, all the troops were successfully transferred to another Blue Funnel ship, SS Eumaeus, and the hospital ship, HMHS Oxfordshire, which had responded to Tyndareus's SOS signals. A British cruiser, HMS Hyacinth, arrived from Simonstown accompanied by a tug to assist the stricken troopship. The captain of Hyacinth ordered that Tyndareus be beached, as it was a hazard to shipping, but Captain Flynn ignored the order and by skillful seamanship and damage control, was able to take the sinking ship safely into Simonstown, where she could be repaired. The Governor General of South Africa, Viscount Buxton, wrote to the chairman of the Blue Funnel Line, congratulating the company and the ship's builders on the design features of the hull which enabled the ship to be saved, which he presumed were "consequent upon the loss of the Titanic".

King George V sent a message to the troops which read:  An oil painting of the soldiers parading on deck was made by Stanley Llewellyn Wood. A memorial stone was commissioned by Lieutenant Colonel Ward recording the gallantry of his men, and was erected on Victoria Peak on Hong Kong Island; it was brought to London in 1994 and is now at the National Army Museum in Chelsea.

Interwar period
Returned to the Blue Funnel Line in 1920, Tyndareus finally began her intended "Trans-Pacific Service" which ran from Hong Kong to Tacoma, Washington, via Japan, Vancouver and Seattle. She was briefly taken-up as a troopship in 1927 to take British reinforcements to Shanghai during the "China Affair". In 1934, her Code Letters were changed to GMKX.

Second World War
In 1940, Tyndareus was requisitioned again to carry troops and military stores. In October 1940, she was one of 32 Allied merchant and transport ships that formed Convoy BN 7, which was on passage from Bombay to Suez via Aden with a heavy naval escort. On 20 October, the convoy was attacked by four Italian destroyers off Massawa in the Red Sea. One Italian destroyer was sunk without loss to the transports, although a British destroyer was disabled and towed to safety. The last wartime convoy for Tyndareus was MKS.99G from Gibraltar to Liverpool, arriving on 12 May 1945.

Postwar
In 1949, Tyndareus was refitted at a cost of £126,650  to take Muslims on the Hajj, the annual pilgrimage to Mecca, with accommodation for 2,500 pilgrims. First sailing from Indonesia to Jeddah in 1950, she continued without a serious breakdown until a replacement was acquired in 1960. She finally arrived at Hong Kong on 9 September 1960, where she was broken up.

References

1915 ships
Ships built on the River Clyde
World War I passenger ships of the United Kingdom
Steamships of the United Kingdom
Troop ships of the Royal Navy
Troop ships of the United Kingdom
Maritime incidents in 1917
Passenger ships of the United Kingdom
World War II passenger ships of the United Kingdom